Impact is a 1963 British crime thriller directed by Peter Maxwell and starring Conrad Phillips with the pair writing the script.  The pair formed a production company Arriba Productions, but Maxwell left for Australia to shoot the Whiplash TV series and never returned to the UK.

Plot
Seeking vengeance for newspaper articles written about him, crooked Soho nightclub owner 'The Duke' (George Pastell), kidnaps crime reporter Jack Moir (Conrad Phillips), and frames him for theft. While serving a two-year prison sentence Moir plots his revenge and, upon release, embarks on a scheme to clear his name.

Cast
 Conrad Phillips as Jack Moir
 George Pastell as Sebastian 'The Duke' Dukelow
 Ballard Berkeley as Bill MacKenzie
 Linda Marlowe as Diana Travers
 Richard Klee as Wally Wheeler
 Anita West as Melanie Calf
 John Rees as Charlie Wright
 Frank Pettitt as Sid the Foreman
 Edward Ogden as Maury Parfitt
 Jean Trend as Hilda, the Secretary
 Desmond Cullum-Jones as Prison Warder
 Mike Pratt as Detective Sergeant
  Don Barkham as Constable	
  Cecil Waters as Jules

Anita West, (born Weust), was Ray Ellington's spouse from 1956–62, and (briefly) a Blue Peter presenter.

Critical reception
The Movie Scene wrote, "Impact is the sort of old British movie which you stumble across one day on one of those channels which appear well down the list which some people don't even know exist. It is also one of those movies which you start watching and an hour later it is over and you can't remember a great deal of what has happened. The reason why is that it is devoid of excitement and seems to have been made hastily on limited funds forcing the writer to use lots of dialogue to explain things rather than showing it". The Radio Times reviewer commented: "this programme filler, produced in a matter of days on a shoestring budget, contains no surprises in the plot...Maxwell just about keeps what action there is ticking over, but he is fighting a losing battle with a cast that is substandard, even for a British B-movie". Sky Movies described it as a "lively thriller about a reporter who wages a vendetta against a treacherous Soho gangster. George Pastell, as the villain, and Anita West, as a moll, give competent performances."

References

External links
 

1963 films
British crime thriller films
Films directed by Peter Maxwell
Films shot at MGM-British Studios
1960s English-language films
1960s British films